The Hawaii State Public Library System (HSPLS) is the only statewide public library system in the United States. 

The system has 51 libraries on all the major Hawaiian Islands: Big Island of Hawaii, Kauai, Lānai, Maui, Molokai and Oahu. The system's collection of books and other library materials totals over three million. There is one library for the blind and physically handicapped, located on Oahu.  The Hawaii State Public Library System is headed by the Hawaii State Librarian, currently Stacey Aldrich, who reports to the Hawaii Board of Education.

The flagship Hawaii State Library, built in 1911 and designed by architect Henry D. Whitfield, was funded in part by industrialist and philanthropist Andrew Carnegie. It is a historic downtown Honolulu building.

Early years 
In 1879, the Honolulu Library and Reading Room Association was formed.  The HLRRA was Hawaii's second subscription library and was supported by the Hawaiian royal family.  King Kalakaua, Queen Kapionlani, Queen Emma, and Princess Bernice Pauahi Bishop gave financially and donated their personal book collections to the association.  King Kalakaua gave tax exemptions and a land grant for a site in downtown Honolulu.

First library of Hawaii 
The Hawaii Library and Reading Room Association served the people of Hawaii for 34 years, and in 1909 signed an agreement with the trustees of the Library of Hawaii to contribute the collection of 20,000 printed materials, furnishings, and funds toward the new library.  The trustees obtained a $100,000 grant from the Andrew Carnegie Foundation for the new library building.  The cornerstone was laid on October 21, 1911, and the first day the library opened was February 1, 1913.  The front columns identify the building as a Carnegie library, and the total cost of the building was $127,000 with the territorial legislature providing the additional $27,000.  During the next 10 years the library grew rapidly, and in 1927 the legislation appropriated $300,000 to expand and renovate the original building.  The expansion was designed by C.W. Dickey and included the addition of two wings creating a quadrangle with an open-air courtyard in the middle.  In 1978, the building was designated a historic site and was added to the National Register of Historic Places. In 1990, the State Legislation passed funding for a second renovation.  The updated building now includes air conditioning, a new roof, new plumbing, handicapped access, landscaping, and another large wing successfully blending in with the existing building.

List of public libraries in the system
Hawaii County – Hawaii (island) (12)
North Kohala Public Library 
Hilo Public Library  
Honokaa Public Library 
Kailua-Kona Public Library 
Keaau Public and School Library 
Kealakekua Public Library 
Laupāhoehoe Public and School Library 
Mountain View Public and School Library 
Nāālehu Public Library 
Pāhala Public and School Library 
Pāhoa Public and School Library 
Thelma Parker Memorial Public and School Library 
Kauai County (6)
Hanapēpē Public Library 
Kapaa Public Library 
Kōloa Public and School Library 
Līhue Public Library 
Princeville Public Library 
Waimea Public Library 
Lānai (1)
Lānai Public and School Library

Maui County (6)
Hana Public and School Library 
Kahului Public Library 
Kīhei Public Library 
Lahaina Public Library 
Makawao Public Library 
Wailuku Public Library
Molokai (1)
Molokai Public Library

City and County of Honolulu – Oahu (25)
Aiea Public Library 
Āina Haina Public Library 
Ewa Beach Public and School Library 
Hawaii Kai Public Library 
Hawaii State Library
Kahuku Public and School Library 
Kailua Public Library 
Kaimukī Public Library 
Kalihi-Pālama Public Library 
Kāneohe Public Library 
Kapolei Public Library 
Library for the Blind and Physically Handicapped 
Liliha Public Library 
Mānoa Public Library 
McCully-Mōiliili Public Library 
Mililani Public Library 
Nānākuli Public Library 
Pearl City Public Library 
Salt Lake/Moanalua Public Library 
Wahiawā Public Library 
Waialua Public Library 
Waianae Public Library 
Waikīkī-Kapahulu Public Library 
Waimānalo Public & School Library 
Waipahu Public Library

References

External links

 Official website

Public libraries in Hawaii
State agencies of Hawaii